Rugosana is a genus of leafhoppers belonging to the family Cicadellidae. The species of this genus are found in North America.

Species
The following species are recognised in the genus Rugosana:
 

Rugosana ampliata 
Rugosana carpa 
Rugosana chadana 
Rugosana compta 
Rugosana consora 
Rugosana edita 
Rugosana fibrata 
Rugosana lora 
Rugosana manua 
Rugosana pacta 
Rugosana plummeri 
Rugosana pullata 
Rugosana puniceiventris 
Rugosana querci 
Rugosana ramosa 
Rugosana reta 
Rugosana rugosa 
Rugosana urbana 
Rugosana varga 
Rugosana venusta 
Rugosana verrucosa

References

Cicadellidae
Hemiptera genera